Al-Bu Badri is a notable Arab tribe in Iraq, predominantly based in Samarra, Diyala and Baghdad. It is mostly a Sunni tribe of around 25,000 but has a small Shia minority of about 1,500.

History
The eponymous founder of the tribe, Badri bin Armoush, moved from Medina in modern-day Saudi Arabia to Samarra in Iraq in the 1700s. He married an Iraqi woman and had five sons.

Modern history
Some notable members of this tribe are as follows:
Ibrahim bin Awad bin Ibrahim ibn Ali ibn Mohammad bin Badri bin Armoush, commonly known as Abu Bakr al-Baghdadi, the deceased former leader of the Islamic State of Iraq and the Levant movement.
Abd al-Aziz al-Badri, founder of the Iraqi branch of the international Islamic movement Hizb ut-Tahrir. Also close to the Muslim Brotherhood in Iraq. Executed in 1969 by the Ba'ath regime.
Subhi al-Badri al-Samerai, Sunni Islamic scholar. He taught  at the Iraqi University (formerly Islamic University).
Lieutenant General Nassif Jassem al-Samerai
Haitham al-Badri, emir of Saladin Governorate for Tanzim Qaidat al-Jihad fi Bilad al-Rafidayn. Ordered the 2006 al-Askari mosque bombing.

Lineage
 
The tribe is known for being descended from the Islamic Prophet Muhammad. Their descent is as follows: From the descendants of Armoush bin Ali bin Eid bin Badri bin Badr al-Din bin Khalil bin Hussain bin Abdallah bin Ibrahim al-Awah bin al-Sharif Yehia Ez al-Din bin al-Sharif Bashir bin Majed bin Atiah bin Yaala bin Douwed bin Majed bin Abdulrahman bin Qassem bin al-Sharif Idriss bin Jaafar al-Zaki bin Ali al-Hadi bin Mohamad al-Jawad bin Ali al-Rida bin Mossa al-Kazem bin Jaafar al-Sadeq bin Mohamad al-Baqer bin Ali Zein al-Abidin bin al-Hussain bin Ali bin Abi Taleb and Fatima, daughter of Mohammad.

References

Tribes of Iraq